Huntville, Indiana may refer to:

Huntsville, Madison County, Indiana, an unincorporated community in Fall Creek Township
Huntsville, Randolph County, Indiana, an unincorporated community in Union Township